Pablo Hernán Lavallén (born 7 September 1972) is an Argentine football manager and former player who played as a defender.

Playing career
Lavallén made his professional debut in 1991 for River Plate, over the following five years he won three league titles and the Copa Libertadores 1996 championship with the team.

In 1996, he joined Atlas where he played until his return to Argentina in 2002 to play for Huracán. In 2003, he joined Real San Luis where he played until 2004.

In 2004, he returned to Argentina to play for newly promoted Huracán de Tres Arroyos but he returned to Mexico after they were relegated in 2005. His last Mexican club was Coyotes de Sonora, he retired in 2007 after a brief stint in the Argentine 2nd division with Club Atlético Platense.

Managerial career
In July 2022 he became manager of Peruvian club Melgar. He was sacked the following 6 March, after a poor start of the season.

Titles

References

External links

1972 births
Living people
Footballers from Buenos Aires
Argentine footballers
Association football defenders
Club Atlético River Plate footballers
Club Atlético Huracán footballers
Club Atlético Platense footballers
Atlas F.C. footballers
San Luis F.C. players
Huracán de Tres Arroyos footballers
C.D. Veracruz footballers
Argentine Primera División players
Liga MX players
Argentine expatriate footballers
Expatriate footballers in Mexico
Argentine football managers
FBC Melgar managers
Argentine expatriate football managers
Expatriate football managers in Peru
Argentina youth international footballers
Club Atlético Belgrano managers
San Martín de San Juan managers
Atlético Tucumán managers
Club Atlético Colón managers
C.D. Olimpia managers